Oorukku Oru Pillai is a 1982 Indian Tamil-language film, directed by D. Yoganand  and produced by K. S. Kutralingam. The film stars Sivaji Ganesan, K. R. Vijaya, M. N. Nambiar and V. K. Ramasamy. It was released on 5 February 1982.

Plot 
Sivaji and Vijaya are cousins. Vijaya is in love with Sivaji while Sivaji, a hotshot lawyer and junior of Major, is in love with Major's daughter played by Sripriya. On the day of engagement, Sripriya finds out that Vijaya is in love with Sivaji and would kill herself if she does not get to marry him. On the altar, she dumps Sivaji without giving any reason and he moves back to his native place giving up his practice.

Sivaji's father's dream was to open a school and put an end to the atrocities of Ramasamy, Nambiar and Srinivasan trio who take advantage of the uneducated masses of their village. They also commit murder and blame it on ghosts with authorities in their cohorts. Coincidentally, Sripriya gets married to Ramasamy's relative, dies due to alcoholism and leaves her with a child and at Ramasamy's mercy as Major died in shock. She seeks refuge with Sivaji and Vijaya who are now married and run a school standing up against Ramasamy.

Nambiar has designs on Sripriya but Sivaji actively thwarts his attempts which causes rumors of affair between the two. When a student of Sivaji gets raped and murdered by Nambiar who blames it on ghosts, Sivaji takes up his practice again and starts to expose Ramasamy. They kidnap Vijaya and Sripriya. After a long struggle, Sivaji saves them only after Sripriya has killed Nambiar in self-defense. Sivaji saves her from clutches of law, exposes all activities of the trio and brings justice to his village.

Cast 
Sivaji Ganesan
K. R. Vijaya
M. N. Nambiar
V. K. Ramasamy
Thengai Srinivasan
Suruli Rajan
Sachu
Sripriya
Major Sundarrajan

Soundtrack 
The music was composed by M. S. Viswanathan, with lyrics by Muthulingam.

Reception 
Kalki gave the film a mixed review.

References

External links 
 

1980s Tamil-language films
1982 films
Films directed by D. Yoganand
Films scored by M. S. Viswanathan